The  is a 36-story skyscraper located in Kasumigaseki, Chiyoda, Tokyo.

History 
The building is owned by the Kasumi Kaikan (霞会館), an association of the former kazoku high nobility. The plot was once owned by the Kazoku Kaikan (華族会館), the previous association, which was changed after World War II in 1947.

Completed in 1968, the building is widely regarded as the first modern office skyscraper in Japan. The reason high-rise buildings were not built in the country earlier was that Japan's Building Standard Law set an absolute height limit of  until 1963, when the limit was abolished in favor of a Floor Area Ratio limit.

Tenants
The Asian Development Bank Institute has its head office on the 8th floor of the Kasumigaseki Building. On the same floor, the Asian Development Bank has its Japan offices. PricewaterhouseCoopers has offices on the 15th floor of the building.

At one time All Nippon Airways had its headquarters in the building, as did Mitsui Chemicals. In July 1978, when Nippon Cargo Airlines first began, it operated within a single room inside All Nippon Airways's space in the Kasumigaseki Building.

Two airlines, Garuda Indonesia and Union des Transports Aériens, at one time had offices in the building.

The Kasumi Kaikan has their club rooms on the 34th floor and is strictly for members only, namely descendants of the kazoku.

In popular culture
The Kasumigaseki Building is the main subject of the film Chōkōsō no Akebono, which was backed by Kajima Construction, the company that built the Kasumigaseki Building.
The building was often used for comparison to things with large volumes in Japan which continued until the construction of the Tokyo Dome, a huge indoor stadium.

References

External links

 Kasumigaseki Building Official site (in Japanese)

Skyscraper office buildings in Tokyo
All Nippon Airways
Office buildings completed in 1968
Airline headquarters
Mitsui Fudosan
1968 establishments in Japan
Buildings and structures in Chiyoda, Tokyo